The 2004 Junior Pan American Artistic Gymnastics Championships was held in San Salvador, El Salvador, October 14–18, 2004.

Medal summary

Medal table

References

2004 in gymnastics
Pan American Gymnastics Championships
International gymnastics competitions hosted by El Salvador